Andreas Johansson may refer to:

 Andreas Johansson (footballer, born 1978), Swedish former footballer that most recently was playing for Djurgårdens IF
 Andreas Johansson (footballer, born 1982), Swedish footballer playing for Halmstads BK 
 Andreas Johansson (ice hockey) (born 1973), Swedish hockey player
 Andreas Johansson, drummer in Narnia
 Andreas Johansson, bass guitarist in Cult of Luna